Alathiyur is a village in the Tirur taluk of Malappuram district, and it is a growing suburban area of Tirur Town Kerala, India. Alathiyur is located 6 km south of Tirur on the road towards Ponnani. Govinda Bhattathiri, a legendary figure in the Kerala astrological traditions, was born in this village in 1237 CE.

Culture
Alathiyur village is a predominantly Muslim populated area. Hindus exist in comparatively smaller numbers, but the culture of the locality is based upon Muslim traditions. Duff Muttu, Kolkali and Aravanamuttu are common folk arts of this locality. There are many libraries attached to mosques giving a rich source of Islamic studies.  Most of the books are written in Arabi-Malayalam which is a version of the Malayalam language written in Arabic script. People gather in mosques for the evening prayer and continue to sit there after the prayers discussing social and cultural issues.  Business and family issues are also sorted out during these evening meetings. The Hindu minority of this area keeps their rich traditions by celebrating various festivals in their temples.  Hindu rituals are done here with a regular devotion like other parts of Kerala.

Transportation
Alathiyur village connects to other parts of India through Tirur town. National highway No.66 passes through Tirur and the northern stretch connects to Goa and Mumbai.  The southern stretch connects to Cochin and Trivandrum. Highway No.966 goes to Palakkad and Coimbatore. The nearest airport is at Kozhikode. The nearest major railway station is at Tirur.

References 

Cities and towns in Malappuram district
Tirur area